Rajeswari Nachiyar is the titular ruler of the estate of Ramnad. She is the only daughter of Ramanatha Sethupathi.

Succession 

Rajeswari Nachiyar assumed the hereditary title of the ruler of Ramnad on the death of her father Ramanatha Sethupathi in 1979. Though she scarcely wields any real authority, she is the managing trustee of a number of temples and the palaces owned by the family.

Notes 

People from Tamil Nadu